V12 or V-12 may refer to:

Technology
 V12 engine, a V engine with twelve cylinders in two banks of six
 Victor V12, a HP-12C Platinum calculator clone

Military
 V-12 Navy College Training Program, in the United States during World War II
 Mil V-12, the largest helicopter ever built
 Pilatus OV-12, a planned military version of the PC-6 STOL aircraft
 Rockwell XFV-12, an experimental 1970s American V/STOL aircraft project
 Vultee V-12, a 1930s American attack aircraft

Other
Simpiwe Vetyeka, a boxer nicknamed "V12"